Lake Jualbup, formerly the Shenton Park Lake, is a freshwater lake located in Perth, Western Australia.

Description
 
The lake is contained within Shenton Park, a parkland in the suburb of Shenton Park, bounded by Lake Avenue, Excelsior Street, Evans Street and Herbert Road. As well as the lakes themselves, the park area includes open grassed space, barbecues and playground equipment and a masonry building and public toilet in the south-west corner. The lake is generally full during the winter rainy season, but can dry up completely during the summer months. A variety of birdlife (including the famous black swan) can be found around the lake, as well as a number of aquatic creatures such as turtles.

The area surrounding Lake Jualbup was originally known as Jualbup, an Aboriginal term meaning "a place where water rises in the season of spring". In the early days of European settlement, a timber miller named James Dyson worked in the area, and thus it became known as Dyson's Swamp. In 1877, James Dyson sold his swamp to George Shenton's son. Later it was renamed Shenton Park Lake, after the land developer and politician, George Shenton. The Aboriginal name "Jualbup" was restored to the lake in 1996.

See also

 List of lakes of Western Australia

References

Lakes of Perth, Western Australia
City of Nedlands
Shenton Park, Western Australia